Lunulicardia is a genus of saltwater clams, marine bivalve molluscs in the family Cardiidae, the cockles. Fossils species in this genus are present in the Pliocene deposits of Indonesia and the Miocene deposits of Russia.

Species
Species within the genus Lunulicardia include:
Lunulicardia hemicardium (Linnaeus, 1758)
Lunulicardia orlini Mienis, 2009
Lunulicardia retusa (Linnaeus, 1767)
 Lunulicardia tumorifera (Lamarck, 1819)
Species brought into synonymy
 Lunulicardia auricula (Niebuhr in Forsskål, 1775): synonym of Lunulicardia retusa auricula (Niebuhr, 1775)
 Lunulicardia hemicardia [sic]: synonym of Lunulicardia hemicardium (Linnaeus, 1758) (misspelling)
 Lunulicardia subretusa Sowerby: synonym of Lunulicardia retusa (Linnaeus, 1767)

References

External links
 Gray, J. E. (1853). A revision of the genera of some of the families of Conchifera or bivalve shells. Annals and Magazine of Natural History. (2) 11: 33-44, 398-402
 Spengler, L. (1799). Over det toskallede Slægt, Hiertemuslingen, Cardium Linnéi. Skrivter af Naturhistorie-Selskabet, Kiøbenhavn. 5(1): 1-60, pl. 1.
 Bayle E. (1879). Liste rectificative de quelques noms de genres. Journal de Conchyliologie. 27(1): 34-35
Paleobiology Database
Sepkoski's Online Genus Database
WoRMS
Encyclopaedia of Life

Cardiidae
Bivalve genera